Silverbeet is an album by the New Zealand band the Bats, released in 1993.

The album was recorded from 15 November to 2 December 1992, at The Outpost in Stoughton, Massachusetts.

"Courage" was released as a CD single that included two additional non-album tracks and a reworked version of "Slow Alight". Silverbeet peaked at No. 26 on the New Zealand album charts.

Critical reception

The Washington Post wrote that "the album's melodies overshadow the lyrics, conveying an impression that's blithe and hopeful." The Hamilton Spectator noted that "there are flashes of alternative favorites Inspiral Carpets and glimpses of Happy Mondays, but The Bats hold their own in terms of strong songwriting, even though their lyrics seem internal and uncertain."

Track listing

Paul Kean has stated that the song "Slow Alight" on the album is actually named "Alight From The Rear".

Personnel
Malcolm Grant - drums, cover art
Paul Kean - bass, vocals, piano (track 6), guitar (track 11)
Robert Scott - guitar, lead vocals, keyboards (tracks 1, 6  & 13)
Kaye Woodward - guitar, vocals, keyboards (track 5)

Also credited:
Lou Giordano - engineer, producer

References

The Bats (New Zealand band) albums
1993 albums
Flying Nun Records albums
Dunedin Sound albums
Albums produced by Lou Giordano